Steganacin is an dibenzocyclooctadiene lactone, an unusual type of lignan. It exhibits some antileukemic properties. It has been isolated from Steganotaenia araliacea. (−)-Steganacin is the natural form.

Notes 

Lignans
Antineoplastic drugs
Cancer treatments
Benzodioxoles
Heterocyclic compounds with 5 rings
Acetate esters
Methoxy compounds
Lactones